Omrani may refer to:
Abdelhakim Omrani (b. 1991), Algerian footballer 
Billel Omrani (b. 1993), French footballer 
Omrani, Iran, a village in Razavi Khorasan Province, Iran